Nkwanta is the capital of Nkwanta South district, in the Volta Region of Ghana.

Nkwanta may also refer to:

Districts
Nkwanta North District
Nkwanta South District

Constituencies
Nkwanta South (Ghana parliament constituency)
Nkwanta North (Ghana parliament constituency)

Towns
Manso Nkwanta
Duayaw Nkwanta